Kratz is a surname.

People surnamed Kratz include:

 Clayton Kratz (1896–1920), American Mennonite relief worker
 Erik Kratz (born 1980), American professional baseball catcher
 Ken Kratz (born 1960-61), American lawyer, former district attorney of Calumet County, Wisconsin; law license was suspended for four months after sexting scandal
 Kevin Kratz (born 1987), German footballer
 Marlene Kratz, fictional character from the Australian soap opera Neighbours
 Mayme Kratz (born 1958), American artist
 Reinhard Gregor Kratz (born 1957), German historian and theologian
 Sam Kratz, fictional character from the Australian soap opera Neighbours